A Swell-Looking Babe is an American crime novel by Jim Thompson.

Plot
Dusty, a bellboy looking to raise enough money for medical school, falls for the wrong woman.

Film adaptation
A Swell-Looking Babe was adapted into the 1996 film Hit Me starring Elias Koteas as the bellboy, who is renamed "Sonny" in the film adaptation.

References

Novels by Jim Thompson
1954 American novels
American novels adapted into films